1776 in philosophy

Events

Publications 
 Adam Smith, The Wealth of Nations (1776)
 Thomas Paine, Common Sense (1776)
 United States Declaration of Independence

Births 

Sophie Germain

Deaths 
 August 25 - David Hume (born 1711)

References 

Philosophy
18th-century philosophy
Philosophy by year